Nomar Shamir Mazara Jiminián (born April 26, 1995) is a Dominican professional baseball right fielder in the Baltimore Orioles organization. He has previously played in MLB for the Texas Rangers, Chicago White Sox, Detroit Tigers, and the San Diego Padres.

Professional career

Minor Leagues
Mazara signed with the Texas Rangers as an international free agent to a $5 million signing bonus in July 2011; the bonus was a record for a non-American prospect. He made his professional debut with the Arizona Rangers of the Rookie-level Arizona League in 2012, and compiled a.264 batting average, .383 on-base percentage, .448 slugging percentage, and six home runs in 54 games. In 2013, Mazara played in 126 games for the Hickory Crawdads of the Class A South Atlantic League, hitting .236 with a .310 on-base percentage, .382 slugging percentage, and 13 home runs. Mazara returned to Hickory to start the 2014 season. In August, he was promoted to the Frisco RoughRiders of the Class AA Texas League, skipping the Class A-Advanced level. Mazara began the 2015 season with Frisco, and was promoted to the Round Rock Express of the Class AAA Pacific Coast League (PCL) on August 17. The Rangers added him to their 40-man roster after the 2015 season to protect him from being eligible to be selected in the Rule 5 draft.

Texas Rangers

2016

Mazara began the 2016 season in Triple-A Round Rock. The Rangers promoted Mazara to the major leagues on April 10, following an injury to Shin-Soo Choo. In his MLB debut, Mazara batted second and hit a single off of Jered Weaver of the Los Angeles Angels of Anaheim in his first at bat to get his first major league hit. Mazara followed that up with another single, and in his third at bat, his first major league home run off of Weaver. Mazara provided the only run for the Rangers in his debut, going 3-for-4. Mazara batted .333 in April, and won the American League Rookie of the Month Award. On May 25, 2016, Mazara hit a massive 491-foot home run off of Angels starter Hector Santiago. Mazara continued to bat over .300 for the month of May and he yet again won the American League Rookie of the Month.

2017
To begin play in 2017, Mazara hit .417 with 2 home runs and 9 RBI's, one of those home runs being his first career Grand Slam which was hit on April 7 against the Oakland Athletics, propelling him to the American League Player of the Week. Mazara finished the 2017 season with a batting line of: .253/.323/.422/.745 with 20 home runs and a team leading 101 RBI.

2018
In 2018, Mazara posted a batting line of .258/.317/.436/.753 with 20 home runs and 77 RBI. Mazara landed on the disabled list from July 20 to August 16 with a right thumb sprain. The injury lingered and hampered Mazara through the end of the season, but did not require surgery to fix.

2019
On June 21, 2019, Mazara hit a home run estimated at 505 feet off of Reynaldo López of the Chicago White Sox, the longest home run hit by any major leaguer in 2019. In 2019, Mazara hit .268/.318/.469/.786 with 19 home runs and 66 RBIs.

Chicago White Sox
On December 11, 2019, Mazara was traded to the Chicago White Sox in exchange for Steele Walker. Overall with the 2020 Chicago White Sox, Mazara batted .228 with one home run and 15 RBIs in 42 games. On December 2, Mazara was non-tendered by the White Sox.

Detroit Tigers
On February 11, 2021, Mazara signed a one-year deal with the Detroit Tigers worth $1.75 million plus incentives. On March 27, Tigers manager A. J. Hinch announced that Mazara had made the team's opening day roster. Mazara played in 50 games for Detroit, slashing .212/.276/.321 with 3 home runs and 19 RBI. He was designated for assignment by the Tigers on July 16. He was released by Detroit on July 23.

San Diego Padres
On December 16, 2021, Mazara signed a minor league contract with the San Diego Padres. He began the 2022 season with the El Paso Chihuahuas of the PCL. The Padres promoted Mazara to the major leagues on June 2. The Padres designated Mazara for assignment on August 20. He cleared waivers and elected free agency on August 23, 2022.

Baltimore Orioles 
On December 6, 2022, Mazara signed a minor league contract with the Baltimore Orioles.

References

External links

1995 births
Living people
Sportspeople from Santo Domingo
Dominican Republic expatriate baseball players in the United States
Dominican Republic people of Italian descent
Major League Baseball players from the Dominican Republic
Major League Baseball right fielders
Texas Rangers players
Chicago White Sox players
Detroit Tigers players
San Diego Padres players
Arizona League Rangers players
Hickory Crawdads players
Frisco RoughRiders players
Round Rock Express players
Tigres del Licey players
Toledo Mud Hens players
El Paso Chihuahuas players